Inside Out is the debut studio album by American country music singer Lee Greenwood, released in 1982. It was certified gold.

Track listing

Personnel
Pete Bordanali - guitar
Jerry Carrigan - drums
Phil Forrest - background vocals
Steve Gibson - guitar
Greg Gordon - background vocals
Lee Greenwood - lead vocals
Sheri Huffman - background vocals
The Nashville String Machine - strings
Farrell Morris - percussion
Weldon Myrick - steel guitar
Hargus "Pig" Robbins - piano
Steve Schaffer - bass guitar
Billy Sanford - guitar
Jerry Shook - guitar
Lisa Silver - background vocals
Larry Stewart - background vocals
The Sheldon Kurland Strings - strings
Diane Tidwell - background vocals
Pete Wade - guitar
Bergen White - background vocals, string arrangements
Jack Williams - bass guitar

Charts

Weekly charts

Year-end charts

Certifications

References

1982 debut albums
Lee Greenwood albums
Albums produced by Jerry Crutchfield
MCA Records albums